Winton is a player character appearing in the 2016 video game Overwatch, a Blizzard Entertainment developed first-person shooter and its related media. Winston is one of the more prominent characters used by Blizzard in Overwatch media outside of the video game; the character made an appearance in the game's cinematic trailer and is the focus of an animated short released by Blizzard.

The character is a genetically engineered gorilla that was part of a larger group of genetically engineered gorillas that was used by the in-universe Horizon Lunar Colony to test the effects of prolonged habitation in space.

Development and design
Winston was first showcased at Overwatch's BlizzCon 2014 reveal. Winston was noted to be dressed in a heavy white armor and wearing eyeglasses, as well as having an electrically charged melee attack. American voice actor Crispin Freeman provides the English voice-over for Winston.

Overwatch's Principal Designer Geoff Goodman stated that Winston, and fellow tank character D.Va, were designed to have relatively low damage output because "they are both very mobile and very hard to kill. Every character in the game has strengths and weaknesses, it's part of what makes the teamplay work well." Toward the end of Overwatch'''s beta period, Winston's shield health was nerfed, due to his "huge hitbox and tiny armor amount."

Gameplay
Winston has a tank role in Overwatch; out of all the tank characters in the game, he is the most agile. Matt Whittaker of Hardcore Gamer expressed that Winston's abilities allow "the best Winston players [to] utilize his abilities to pull opponents off of the objective, freeing teammates to either attack or defend in peace." Although Winston has relatively low damage output, his Tesla Cannon deals close-range damage in a cone that continuously damages any opponent within that cone. The weapon's damage cannot be blocked or deflected. Winston also comes equipped with a jump pack that allows him to reach objectives quickly, get out of battles, and damage any opponent within the vicinity of his landing spot. Winston's second ability, "Barrier Projector", creates a bubble barrier capable of taking small amounts of damage before breaking. His "Primal Rage" ultimate ability boosts his health meter to 1000 hitpoints, causes massive amounts of damage to enemies when Winston punches them, and also speeds up the cool-down rate of his jump pack.

Appearances

Video games
In the Overwatch lore, Winston is a 29-year old genetically engineered gorilla. A scientist and adventurer, Winston was formerly based in the Horizon Lunar Colony, located on the Moon. The Horizon Lunar Colony was established as part of humanity's space exploration; some of its first inhabitants were genetically enhanced gorillas, like Winston, used in tests relating to prolonged space habitation. Due to displaying rapid brain development from the experiment's gene therapy, Winston was taken under Dr. Harold Winston's wing; Dr. Winston taught the young gorilla about science and inspired Winston about human ingenuity. The other gorillas soon led an uprising and killed the colony's scientists, claiming it as their own. Winston took the name of his caretaker, created a rocket and flew to Earth where he would join Overwatch. While in Overwatch, Winston invented the chronal accelerator, which helped fellow Overwatch member Tracer maintain control of her time; before this, Tracer suffered from a chronal dissociation which kept her from keeping a physical form in the present.

Animations
Winston made an appearance in Blizzard's 2014 cinematic trailer for Overwatch. Winston also appeared in Recall, the first of a series of animated Overwatch shorts released by Blizzard. In the Recall short, Winston is seen recalling memories of his days in Overwatch, as well as his extended Horizon Lunar Colony backstory. Additionally, Winston fights back against an attack from Talon, a terrorist organization opposed to Overwatch, and seeking to eliminate former Overwatch members. Winston is attacked at his home and laboratory. In previous events within Overwatch's lore, the Overwatch organization ended with the United Nations' Petras Act, making any Overwatch-related activities illegal. However, at the end of the short, Winston initiates a recall in an effort to bring back Overwatch. The events of the cinematic trailer follow the events in Recall; Talon agents Widowmaker and Reaper attempt to steal the "Doomfist" weapon, used by many villains in Overwatch lore. Winston and Tracer battle Widowmaker and Reaper, before stopping the two from successfully stealing the weapon.

Blizzard also used Winston in a promotional cinematic teaser shortly prior to the release of Overwatch.

Comics
Winston appeared in Reflections, the tenth issue of Overwatch, a digitally released comic series that ties into the events of the video game and animations. The winter holiday-themed issue, titled Reflections, features Winston lamenting about spending the holiday season alone. Tracer and her girlfriend, Emily then surprise Winston and spend the night celebrating the holidays with him.

Winston was later featured in Winston's Journey to the West, a comic in the form of a tapestry. The tapestry was illustrated by SHISHIO. Inspired by the 16th century Chinese novel, Journey to the West, the tapestry was released as part of the game's "Year of the Rooster" event, celebrating the 2017 Lunar New Year. It was released digitally both on the Overwatch blog, as well as an animation on Madefire, where one can scroll down to continue viewing. The tapestry uses visuals and music to tell its story. The narrative of this tapestry involves Winston recollecting Dr. Harold Winston reading Journey to the West to him during his days on the Horizon Lunar Colony. Winston imagines himself and other characters as the characters from the novel; Winston himself is imagined as Sun Wukong, also known as the Monkey King in the novel.

In other media
In 2016, the Jinx clothing line released T-shirts featuring Winston. Players who purchased the Origins Edition of Overwatch receive a "baby Winston" battle pet, based on his appearance in the Recall cinematic, in World of Warcraft; these players will also receive a player avatar of Winston for StarCraft II.

Reception
Winston has been positively received by gaming outlets. Nick Schager of The Daily Beast praised the animation seen in Overwatch, pointing out Winston's cinematic teaser appearance: "The charisma of these avatars is established early on, in an introductory video featuring hyper-intelligent simian warrior Winston that establishes the game’s Earth-under-siege sci-fi premise – and proves to be a tour-de-force of digital animation." Schager also likened Winston to a character "out of a Pixar film (or a similarly gorgeous Disney effort like Big Hero 6)."

Within Overwatch'', Winston is generally considered to be a character than can disrupt an opposing team's organized strategy due to his jumping ability and wide spread of damage once within the team's ranks. Using Winston become part of the "dive" metagame strategy, where the player controlling Winston would jump into the opposing team's backfield to try take out healers and support characters, often sacrificing themselves in the process; the opposing team would need to divert their attention and focus on Winston before they suffer a numbers disadvantage, allowing Winston's allies to push through. While the "dive" metagame has become less popular, players will still typically focus attention on an opposing Winston when in their ranks, often alerting their teammates with the cries of "monkey", since this is easier to say than "Winston".

See also
 List of fictional primates

References

Animal characters in video games
Comics characters introduced in 2016
Fictional gorillas
Fictional inventors in video games
Fictional scientists in video games
Genetically engineered characters in video games
Male characters in animated films
Male characters in comics
Male characters in video games
Fiction set on the Moon
Overwatch characters
Video game characters introduced in 2016
Video game characters with electric or magnetic abilities
Fictional United Nations personnel